Yevgeni Starikov, also known as Eugene Starikov (born November 17, 1988) is an American professional soccer player who plays as a midfielder.

Club career

Early years
Starikov was born in Odessa, USSR and grew up in Huntington Beach, California where he played for Edison High School, San Diego Surf, and Irvine Strikers. He transferred to Florida before his junior year, where he was the Pinellas County scoring champion twice and led the Palm Harbor University High School Hurricanes to a victory in the 2006 FHSAA 5A Championship. He spent two years at Stetson University and played one season for the Bradenton Academics in the USL Premier Development League.

Professional
Starikov was signed by Zenit in the Russian Premier League before the 2009 season. On March 17, 2017, Starikov returned to the United States and signed for NASL side New York Cosmos. On February 6, 2018 Starikov joined the Indy Eleven of the United Soccer League.

International career
On January 7, 2011, Starikov was called up to the United States national team for a friendly game against Chile.

Career statistics

Notes

References

External links
 Miami United bio

1988 births
Living people
Ukrainian emigrants to the United States
American soccer players
American expatriate soccer players
American people of Russian descent
Expatriate footballers in Russia
American expatriate sportspeople in Russia
Stetson Hatters men's soccer players
IMG Academy Bradenton players
FC Zenit Saint Petersburg players
FC Tom Tomsk players
FC Rostov players
New York Cosmos (2010) players
Indy Eleven players
Footballers from Odesa
USL League Two players
Russian Premier League players
North American Soccer League players
USL Championship players
FC Chornomorets Odesa players
Ukrainian Premier League players
Expatriate footballers in Ukraine
American expatriate sportspeople in Ukraine
Association football forwards
National Premier Soccer League players
Association football midfielders